Coochin is a rural locality in the Scenic Rim Region, Queensland, Australia.

History 
In 1877,  were resumed from the Coochin Coochin pastoral run and offered for selection on 19 April 1877.

The locality contained 54 households, in which 50.5% of the population were males and 49.5% were females, with a median age of 51, 13 years above the national average. The average weekly household income was $1,021, $417 below the national average.

Heritage listings 
Coochin has a number of heritage listings, including:
 J Bell Road: Coochin Coochin Homestead

Education 
There are no schools in Coochin. The nearest government primary schools are Mount Alford State School in neighbouring Mount Alford to the north-west and Maroon State School in neighbouring Maroon to the south-east. The nearest government secondary school is Boonah State High School to the north-east.

References

External links 

 

Scenic Rim Region
Localities in Queensland